Sumo Logic, Inc. is a cloud-based machine data analytics company focusing on security, operations and BI usecases. It provides log management and analytics services that use machine-generated big data. Sumo Logic was founded in April 2010 by ArcSight veterans Kumar Saurabh and Christian Beedgen, and is headquartered in Redwood City, California.

On September 17, 2020 Sumo Logic debuted on the NASDAQ stock exchange in its initial public offering as a public company. Sumo Logic's service is powered by patent-pending Elastic Log Processing, LogReduce, and Push Analytics technologies.

History
Sumo Logic was founded in 2010 by a technical leadership team with expertise in log management, scalable systems, Big Data and security.

Ramin Sayar, formerly of VMware, is Sumo Logic's CEO since December 2014.
Previously, Vance Loiselle, formerly of BladeLogic, was CEO between May 2012 and December 2014.

In June 2012, Sumo Logic announced Sumo Logic Free, a freemium full functionality edition of its analytical solution that is deployed on Amazon Web Services, and in August 2012, the company announced Sumo Logic for VMware, which allows enterprises to search, visualize and analyze all VMware logs in real time so they can monitor and detect events within VMware virtual environments.

In 2016, Sumo Logic launched a data analytics platform that unifies logs and metrics to analyze structured metrics data and unstructured log data in real-time through graphical, interactive dashboards.

At the AWS 2017 conference, Sumo Logic presented its machine data analytics service which combines analytics of Docker and Kubernetes. The service streamlines data ingestion for Sumo Logic's machine data analytics service hosted on Amazon Web Services.

In 2018, Sumo Logic announced the expansion of integrations with the Google Cloud Platform, releasing integrations with GCP applications, and an integration with TensorFlow. In September 2018, Sumo Logic announced the addition of a cloud SIEM solution to its machine data analytics platform.

In April 2019, Sumo Logic launched a bidirectional integration for Atlassian’s OpsGenie incident alert service. This integration gives users the ability to create and analyze the alerts and incident data. As of May 2019, the company has collected VC funding totaling $345 million.

In 2021 it was revealed that Sumo Logic, along with other vendors, had a kickback agreement with Michael Kail, a former Netflix vice president of IT operations convicted of fraud for receiving bribes from vendors. According to the US Department of Justice, he "became an advisor and received options for shares in the company Sumo Logic" and "authorized and signed on behalf of Netflix a vendor agreement between Netflix and Sumo Logic". On 4th May 2021 the US Department of Justice announced that Michael Kail had been convicted on a number of counts related to the kick backs received from Sumo Logic and other vendors. Evidence in the case shows that Kail insisted on Sumo Logic's products being used, "despite his IT team feedback about the product underperforming." Evidence presented at trial showed that Kail’s advisor role with Sumo Logic lasted from 2012 to 2014 and that Kail represented and warranted to Sumo Logic that his advisor role and receipt of options would not conflict with or violate any obligation of Kail’s.  The evidence also showed that Sumo Logic was led to believe that there was no conflict with Kail’s obligations to Netflix and that Sumo Logic understood it was not guaranteed any contracts or provided any shortcuts.  Sumo Logic was not a party to the criminal case, and no charges were ever brought, or claims made, against Sumo Logic.

Funding
Sumo Logic received funding from Accel Partners, DFJ Growth, Greylock Partners, Institutional Venture Partners, Sequoia Capital, Sapphire Ventures, Sutter Hill Ventures, angel investor Shlomo Kramer, Battery Ventures, Tiger Global Management and Franklin Templeton.

While Sumo Logic remained in stealth mode for two years, it unveiled its cloud-based log management platform with Series B funding of $15 million in January 2012. The round of Series E funding announced in June 2015 brings the company's total venture capital backing to $160.5 million. On June 27 the company closed its Series F round for $75 million and is on path to IPO.

In May 2019, Sumo Logic announced a $110 million Series G investment and indicated that its valuation was "north of a billion dollars".

Technology and acquisitions
Sumo Logic brands itself as a "continuous intelligence platform" that automates the collection, ingestion and analysis of various types of data into actionable insights for its users. In 2019, the company acquired JASK to combine its security operations center (SOC) with Sumo Logic's security information and event management (SIEM) services. Sumo Logic works with The Pokémon Company to provide analytics for Pokémon GO, including threats, security vulnerabilities, log aggregation, and security analytics.

It expanded into security orchestration, automation, and response (SOAR) and security orchestration, automation, and response (SOAR) technology and monitoring workflow software with the acquisitions of DFLabs and Sensu in 2021. That same year, the company announced DevSecOps tools on its continuous intelligence platform for infrastructure observability and telemetry data analytics of enterprise applications.

Sumo Logic's architecture features an elastic petabyte scale platform that collects, manages, and analyzes enterprise log data, reducing millions of log lines into operational and security insights in real time. Its elastic processing is used to collect, manage, and analyze log data, regardless of type, volume, or location. A cloud-based approach overcomes the inherent problems of premises-based solutions, including limits on scalability, inefficient or haphazard analysis, and uncontrolled costs. Sumo Logic is built around a globally distributed data retention architecture that keeps all log data available for instant analysis, eliminating the need for an enterprise to manage the cost and complexity of data archiving, backups and restoration. The service is entirely cloud-based and is maintenance free.

Awards and recognition
In January, 2012, RSA named Sumo Logic one of its top 10 finalists for the Most Innovative Company at RSA. At the April 2012 Under the Radar Conference, Sumo Logic received the Judge's Choice and the Audience Choice Awards for Performance Monitoring. In May 2012, Sumo Logic was named a Red Herring Americas 2012 Top 100 Winner.

On May 7, 2014, Sumo Logic was named as a Cool Vendor by Gartner in the Application Performance Monitoring (APM) and IT Operations Analytics (ITOA) categories.

In 2019, Fortune named Sumo Logic one of the 50 Best Workplaces in Technology. The same year, Forbes placed Sumo Logic on its Cloud 100 list. In December 2019, Sumo Logic was named Best Enterprise Security Product at Computing’s Technology Product Awards.

On July 6, 2021, industry market research firm, Gartner, named Sumo Logic a Visionary in their 2021 Gartner Magic Quadrant for Security Information and Event Management (SIEM) report. The company was named Independent Software Vendor (ISV) Partner of the Year by Amazon Web Services (AWS) later that year.

References

External links

2010 establishments in California
Big data companies
American companies established in 2010
Software companies established in 2010
Companies based in Redwood City, California
Computer security companies
Cloud computing providers
Information technology companies of the United States
Network management
Software companies based in the San Francisco Bay Area
Software companies of the United States
Security companies of the United States
System administration
2020 initial public offerings
Companies listed on the Nasdaq